María Alejandra Guzmán Carmona (born 4 October 1984), most known as María Alejandra, María Guzmán, or María Alejandra Guzmán, is a Dominican TV and radio hostess, master of ceremonies, actress and model.

María Alejandra Guzmán was born in Santo Domingo, into a Cibaeño family. She participated in Miss World Dominican Republic 2003, been awarded with the Miss Photogenic title. She started her career working for CDN2 (now CDN Sportsmax), a television station based in Santiago de los Caballeros.

She worked on Más Roberto, a weekend TV programme from 2012, until September 2013. In 2013 she was elected by Luz García’s Noche de Luz programme as a "Summer’s Hot Body".

Filmography
2012: Feo de Día, Lindo de Noche —Alfonso Rodríguez (director)

References

External links

1984 births
Living people
Dominican Republic film actresses
Dominican Republic female models
Dominican Republic television presenters
Dominican Republic people of Spanish descent
Dominican Republic women television presenters
White Dominicans